Kibatalia borneensis is a species of plant in the family Apocynaceae. It is endemic to the state of Sarawak, part of Malaysia on the island of Borneo.  It is threatened by habitat loss.

References

borneensis
Endemic flora of Borneo
Flora of Sarawak
Endangered plants
Plants described in 1901
Taxonomy articles created by Polbot
Taxa named by Otto Stapf